Kandla-Gorakhpur LPG pipeline (KGPL) is an under-construction gas pipeline project. The project cost estimation is Rs. 9,000 to 10,000 crore. It has a total length of  stretching from Kandla port in Gujarat to the city of Gorakhpur in Uttar Pradesh via Madhya Pradesh. The oil PSUs, Indian Oil Corporation (IOCL), Bharat Petroleum (BPCL) and Hindustan Petroleum (HPCL) are constructing this pipeline to connect refineries to liquefied petroleum gas (LPG) bottling plants. On 24 February 2019 the Prime Minister of India, Narendra Modi, laid the foundation stone of the pipeline at Gorakhpur.

Project detail 
Total Length: 2,757 km

Gujarat: 1,063 km, Madhya Pradesh':  611 km, Uttar Pradesh': 1,083 km

Line Diameter : 20”, 18”, 16”, 14”, 12”, 10”, 8”

Pumping Stations: Kandla, Mithi Rohar, Viramgam, Dahej, Pipavav,  Dumad,  BPC Bina Refinery, IPS-1 (Ch. 237: Near Indore)

LPG Sources: 

LPG Import Terminals:  Kandla, Mundra (at Mithi Rohar), Dahej, Pipavav

Refineries: IOCL’s Koyali Refinery(Gujarat Refinery), BPCL’s Bina Refinery

See also 

 HVJ Gas Pipeline
 East West Gas Pipeline (India)

References 

Pipelines in India
Liquefied petroleum gas
Energy in Gujarat
Energy in Madhya Pradesh
Energy in Uttar Pradesh
Proposed infrastructure in Gujarat
Proposed infrastructure in Madhya Pradesh
Proposed infrastructure in Uttar Pradesh
Proposed infrastructure in India